Fosse a ditch or moat, may also refer to:

Places
 Fossé, Ardennes, a commune in France
 Fosse, Belgium, a district of the municipality of Trois-Ponts, Wallonia
 Fossé, Loir-et-Cher, a commune in central France
 Fosse, Pyrénées-Orientales, a town in France
 Fosse Copse, a woodland in Devon, England
 Fosse Farmhouse, an 18th-century farmhouse in the Cotswolds, UK
 Fosse Shopping Park, an out of town shopping centre in Leicestershire
 Fosse Way, a Roman road in England
 Fösse, a river of Lower Saxony, Germany

People
 Bob Fosse (1927–1987), American musical theater choreographer 
 Erik Fosse (born 1950), Norwegian physician and musician.
 Jon Fosse (born 1959), Norwegian writer
 Nicole Fosse (born 1963), American actress, dancer and producer
 Ray Fosse (1947–2021), American baseball player
 William Fosse (fl.1407–1411), English lawyer and politician

Other uses
 Fosse (musical), a 1999 Broadway revue based on the choreography of Bob Fosse
 Fosse Awards, a former name of the American Choreography Awards
 Leicester Fosse, a former name of English football club Leicester City

See also
 La Grande-Fosse, Vosges, France
 La Petite-Fosse, Vosges, France
 De la Fosse (disambiguation)
 Foss (disambiguation)
 Fossa (disambiguation)
 Fosses (disambiguation)
 Fossey (disambiguation)